Calahorra [] is a municipality in the comarca of Rioja Baja, near the border with Navarre on the right bank of the Ebro. During Ancient Roman times, Calahorra was a municipium known as Calagurris Nassica Iulia.

Location
The city is located on a hill at an altitude of 358 metres at the confluence of the Ebro and Cidacos rivers, and has an area of 91.41 km². Calahorra is the second-largest city in La Rioja in population and importance, after the capital, Logroño. Its population is 21,060 people.

It is well-connected to other cities, especially by highway. It is situated in the Ebro valley, 48 kilometres from Logroño, 120 km from Zaragoza and 180 km from Bilbao, and is connected to these cities by national highway 232, the A-68 motorway (Vasco-Aragonesa) and the Bilbao-Zaragoza rail line.

Its daily bus services link it to such cities as Pamplona, Soria and San Sebastián.

Its status as seat of a comarca and judicial district make it a service-industry city in administrative, commercial and leisure fields.

History 
Calahorra has been inhabited since the Paleolithic, and its stable population dates to the Iron Age.

Rome conquered the town in 187 BC and brought it to its highest point of importance as an administrative centre for surrounding regions. Calahorra supported Quintus Sertorius in his war against Pompey, whom the city resisted successfully since 76 BC. It was only taken four years later by Pompey's legate Lucius Afranius, after a lot of inhabitants had died from starvation and there had occurred cannibalism. Julius Caesar and Augustus Caesar gave the city (then named Calagurris) numerous distinctions, converted it into a municipality, and developed its city planning, economy, and politics. Its archeological remains show that it had a circus, baths, an amphitheatre, and other services found in large cities. It minted money and served as a justice administration centre.

Quintilian, well known for his descriptions of the culture of that time, was born in Calahorra, and the Parador in the city is named after him. It has Roman ruins in the grounds. Saints Emeterius and Celedonius, martyred in the city around 305 AD, are the patron saints of the city, and the city's coat of arms depict their names. The cathedral is dedicated to them. The Christian Roman poet Prudentius may have inhabited at some point in Calahorra, who pinpoints it on the territory of the Vascones in the 4th century.

After the rule of the Moors in the 9th and 10th centuries the Christian king García Sánchez III of Pamplona captured the city in 1045.

The population had reached 7,000 by the 1840s.

Politics

Places of Interest 
 Calahorra Cathedral

Twin cities 
  Monte Compatri, Italy
  Caussade, France

Gallery

References

External links 

 Official Web Site
 Calahorra (La Rioja) Web Site
 Calahorra Jewish family in Poland

Municipalities in La Rioja (Spain)
Vascones
Coloniae (Roman)